Blast First is a sub label of one-time independent record label Mute Records, founded in approximately 1985. It was named after a phrase taken from the first number of the radical Vorticist journal Blast, published by Wyndham Lewis in 1914. Lewis's "Manifesto" begins with the words "BLAST First (from politeness) ENGLAND".

History 
The label was founded by Paul Smith to give UK release to albums by Sonic Youth, a US band with which he was then working closely. It went on to feature more hardcore rock bands than the master label of its synthpop-oriented parent company. Before Mute Records was sold to the EMI group, Blast First fit into the company's profile, which included labels such as the Fine Line and the Grey Area.

The labels employees included the sisters Pat and Liz Naylor, and the novelist Alistair Fruish.

The label released a range of alternative music from Butthole Surfers and  Labradford through Suicide and Sonic Youth to the William Fairey Band's Acid Brass collection. The latter, a departure for a label noted for its guitar based rock bands, was a covers album of tunes such as A Guy Called Gerald's "Voodoo Ray" and 808 State's "Pacific," all replayed by a brass band. Blast First also organised the Disobey experimental club nights, with Russell Haswell and Bruce Gilbert (aka DJ Beekeeper) of the Post-punk band Wire.

Artists 

A.C. Temple
Acid Brass
The Afghan Whigs
Band of Susans
Beme Seed
Big Black
Big Stick
The Blue Humans
Glenn Branca
Caspar Brötzmann Massaker
Butthole Surfers
Common Language
Dinosaur Jr.
FM Einheit & Caspar Brötzmann
Erase Errata
Fushitsusha
The Charles Gayle Trio
Michael Gibbs
H.O.D.I.C.A.
Keiji Haino
Head of David
Hovercraft
HTRK
KaitO
Richard H. Kirk
Labradford
Liars
Lunachicks
Maxine
The Mekons
Mother Goose
Phill Niblock
Pan Sonic
Rapeman
The Raincoats
Rivulets
Sonic Youth
Ciccone Youth
Lee Ranaldo
Stretchheads
Suicide
Sun Ra
Jimi Tenor
Ed Tomney
2K
Ut

Compilation series 
 Sonic Mook Experiment
 The Devil's Jukebox (Nothing Short Of Total War) – deleted limited edition box set; 3000 UK copies and 1500 US copies were made.

Noted albums 
Albums on Blast First that either reached the UK Albums Chart or have become examples of the indie/alternative genre:
 Big Black – Songs About Fucking (1987) (BFFP 19)
 Sonic Youth – Daydream Nation 2xLP (1988) (BFFP 34)
 Afghan Whigs – Gentlemen (1993) (BFFP 89)
 Butthole Surfers – Locust Abortion Technician (1987) (BFFP 23)
(Note: Blast First was merely the UK label for these US bands, which were all primarily signed to deals with American labels).

See also 
 List of record labels

References

External links 
 Radio 1
Mute Records
Blast First Petite
Discography listing at Rate Your Music
A 2015 interview with Paul Smith

1984 establishments in the United Kingdom
British independent record labels
EMI
Hardcore record labels
Industrial record labels
Alternative rock record labels